The following is a list Teen Choice Award winners and nominees for Choice TV Villain. This award was first given out in 2007.

The all-time winner in this category is Janel Parrish for her role as Mona Vanderwaal in Pretty Little Liars with four wins. Parrish is also the most nominated with 5 nominations and she is the only winner in this category who has won two years on a row twice (2012-2013, 2016-2017). 

The current Choice TV Villain winner is Cameron Monaghan for his roles as Jerome and Jeremiah Valeska in Gotham (2019).

Winners and nominees

2000s

2010s

Most wins 
The following individuals received two or more Choice TV Villain awards:

4 Wins

 Janel Parrish

2 Wins

 Ed Westwick

Most nominations 
The following individuals received two or more Choice TV Villain nominations:

5 Nominations

 Janel Parrish

4 Nominations

 Ed Westwick

3 Nominations

 Jane Lynch
 Zachary Quinto
 Cameron Monaghan
 Michael Rosenbaum
 Vanessa Williams

2 Nominations

 Joseph Morgan
 Lana Parrilla
 Spencer Wratt

References 

Villain